Richard Rutledge (1923-1985), was an American fashion photographer.

Rutledge was a frequent contributor to Vogue, Glamour, and House & Garden.

References

1923 births
1985 deaths
20th-century American photographers
Fashion photographers